EDLN may refer to:
 Mönchengladbach Airport airport code
 Éclaireurs de la Nature